Hagen Fjord is a fjord in north-eastern Greenland. It was named after Niels Peter Høeg Hagen, the cartographer of the main exploration team of the ill-fated Denmark expedition.

Geography
It opens into the southern shore of the Independence Fjord at its northern end, between J.C. Christensen Land to the west and Mylius-Erichsen Land to the east, near the confluence of Denmark Sound and Independence Fjord. The Hagen Glacier has its terminus at the head of the fjord.

See also
List of fjords of Greenland

References

Fjords of Greenland